The Moises Bertoni Foundation was established in January 1988 in memory of Moisés Santiago Bertoni, as an environmental foundation and conservation, aiming to contribute to the protection and sustainable development of natural resources in Paraguay.

The Foundation is a nonprofit organization that specializes in sustainable development and manages the Mbaracayu Natural Forest Reserve, the largest continuous remnant of the Interior Atlantic Forest in Paraguay. The foundation focuses on promoting environmental, social, and economic development, in an effort to overcome the dominant paradigm of conservation as something separate from human activity.

On 29 July 2005, the ABC announced that in August 2005 Yan Speranza would become the new director of the Moises Bertoni Foundation. The current president is Raul Gauto.

See also

 Scientific Monument Moises Bertoni

References

External links
 

Foundations based in Paraguay
1988 establishments in Paraguay